Roberto Natale (born 14 May 2003) is an Italian professional footballer who plays for Napoli.

Club career 
Roberto Natale made his professional debut for the Viterbese on 3 November 2021, along with teammate Simone D'Uffizi, during a 1–0 away Coppa Serie C win against Ancona.

References

External links

2003 births
Living people
Italian footballers
Association football midfielders
Footballers from Naples
U.S. Viterbese 1908 players